is a 2012 Japanese television drama series.

Synopsis
Eisuke (Osamu Mukai), a former bassist of a rock band who gave up his music dreams to carry on the tradition of his family's French restaurant. The show will involve a love triangle as Kuninaka and Takimoto play rivals for Eisuke's heart.

Maria (Ryoko Kuninaka) is Eisuke's older girlfriend who works at a bank. She is shocked to learn that Eisuke has abandoned his music to devote himself to the restaurant, leading her to uncertainty about their relationship because they don't get time for each other. Meanwhile, Chie (Takimoto Miori) is a cheerful 20-year-old college student who come from a farming family. Although she initially had a bad impression of Eisuke, she begins to develop feelings for him after tasting his cooking. It was love which started from her stomach instead of her heart.

SMAP's Inagaki Goro will play Tokio, the owner of a competing French restaurant. In the past, he was fond of the restaurant that Eisuke's mother ran, but after she died, he deceived Eisuke's father and bought out the restaurant's chefs and staff. Knowing of Eisuke's ability as a chef, Tokio views him as a rival.

Eisuke's friends, who were part of his band ROCKHEAD, are being played by Tsukamoto Takashi (guitarist), Miura Shohei (vocalist) and Chemistry's Kawabata Kaname (drummer). They help Eisuke with his restaurant.

Cast
 Osamu Mukai as Eisuke
 Miori Takimoto as Chie
 Goro Inagaki as Tokio
 Ryoko Kuninaka as Maria
 Shohei Miura as Taku
 Takashi Tsukamoto as Kenta
 Kawabata Kaname as Tsuyoshi
 Sato Shori as Sasuke
 Fujii Mina as Momoko (Episode 8)

References

Fuji TV dramas
2012 Japanese television series debuts
Japanese drama television series